Soil zoology or pedozoology is the study of animals living fully or partially in the soil (soil fauna). The field of study was developed in the 1940s by Mercury Ghilarov in Russia. Ghilarov noted inverse relationships between size and numbers of soil organisms. He also suggested that soil included water, air and solid phases and that soil may have provided the transitional environment between aquatic and terrestrial life. The phrase was apparently first used in the English speaking world at a conference of soil zoologists presenting their research at the University of Nottingham, UK, in 1955.

See also
Biogeochemical cycle

References

Bibliography
 Safwat H. Shakir Hanna, ed, 2004, Soil Zoology For Sustainable Development In The 21st century: A Festschrift in Honour of Prof. Samir I. Ghabbour on the Occasion of His 70th Birthday, Cairo, .

External links
D. Keith McE. Kevan, Ethnoentomologist, Cultural Entomology Digest 3

Soil biology
Edaphology
Soil science